Tameka Bradley Hobbs is a historian, educator, author, and activist. She is the Executive Director of the A. Philip Randolph Institute for Law, Race, Social Justice, and Economic Policy at Edward Waters University. She previously was the associate provost of Florida Memorial University and the founding director of the FMU Social Justice Institute think tank and research center. She is the author of the 2015 history book Democracy Abroad, Lynching at Home: Racial Violence in Florida.

Early life and education
Hobbs was raised in Live Oak, Florida. While an undergraduate at Florida A&M University, Hobbs was inspired by an African American history course to shift the focus of her studies from business to history, and graduated with a BA in history. She became interested in becoming an oral historian after speaking with her grandfather about his experience living in Live Oak, and his recollections of the lynching of Willie James Howard in Live Oak, and then focused her research while a graduate student at Florida State University on the history of racial violence in Florida.

Hobbs completed her master's degree and PhD at Florida State University. Her 2000 master's thesis was titled "Lynched Twice: The Murder of A.C. Williams", and the title of her 2004 dissertation is "Hitler is Here: Lynching in Florida during the Era of World War II."

Career
Hobbs' experience as an educator includes teaching at Florida A&M University, Virginia State University, and John Tyler Community College. She has worked as a historian and coordinator for The Valentine Richmond History Center Richmond History Gallery Project and was the Program and Education Manager for the Library of Virginia from 2007 through 2011. Hobbs began teaching at Florida Memorial University (FMU) in 2011. While at FMU, she worked with FMU alumna Sybrina Fulton, the mother of Trayvon Martin, to create the Trayvon Martin Foundation in the campus library in 2014.

Hobbs has written on a variety of subjects, including culture and history. In 2015, Hobbs published Democracy Abroad, Lynching At Home: Racial Violence In Florida, which won a Bronze Florida Book Award and includes oral histories of family members and descendents of lynching victims. In 2021, Hobbs described oral history as a way to "wrest control of a community’s narrative from white-controlled institutions."

In 2020, as associate provost at Florida Memorial University, Hobbs became the founding director of the FMU Social Justice Institute, a think tank and research center focused on systemic racism in Florida. When the US Congress considered making lynching a federal crime in 2020, Hobbs spoke with The New York Times about people who lack of awareness of the historical magnitude of violence motivated by racism in the United States, and stated, "I think if they understood that, perhaps they would understand the Black Lives Matter movement as an extension of centuries, really, of advocacy on the part of African-Americans."

Works

Honors and awards
 2015 Florida Book Award Bronze Medal for Democracy Abroad, Lynching At Home
 2016 Harry T. and Harriette V. Moore Award from the Florida Historical Society for Democracy Abroad, Lynching At Home

References

External links 
 

Living people
Historians from Florida
Florida A&M University alumni
Florida State University alumni
Florida Memorial University
African-American historians
Educators from Florida
American women academics
African-American women academics
African-American academics
21st-century American women educators
21st-century American educators
African-American educators
African-American women writers
21st-century American women writers
African-American activists
Black Lives Matter people
Year of birth missing (living people)